Cara Black and Rennae Stubbs were the defending champions but chose to participate with different partners. Stubbs teamed up with Květa Peschke and was eliminated in the second round. Black paired up with Liezel Huber and together they won the title after defeating Victoria Azarenka and Anna Chakvetadze 7–5, 6–4 in the final.

Seeds
The top four seeds received a bye into the second round.

Draw

Finals

Top half

Bottom half

References
 Main Draw

Acura Classic - Doubles
2007 Doubles